Jerome Jesus Rivera (born April 22, 1995) is an American mixed martial artist who competes in the Flyweight division. He most notably competed in the Ultimate Fighting Championship.

Background

Rivera started training in 2011, Rivera held an amateur kickboxing belt for SWKA, which is a promotion in Las Cruces, New Mexico. Since he was a kid, he loved watching UFC and wrestled at school.

Mixed martial arts career

Early career

Rivera made his MMA debut at Triple-A MMA 5 Redemption at the Rock,  where he faced Levi Lucero and submitted him via rear-naked choke in the first round. Rivera would go on to defeat his next three foes, all by the way of submission stoppages. After defeating Jesus Urbina at KOTC Thunder via unanimous decision and  Saul Elizondo in the second round via rear-naked choke at Jackson-Wink Fight Night 1, Riveria made his Legacy Fighting Alliance debut at LFA 10, where he faced Zac Riley and went on to defeat him via unanimous decision.

In June 2017, Rivera lost for the first time to Roberto Sanchez via third round armbar at LFA 14. After a 11 months layoff, he suffered a dislocated elbow in a loss by injury to Brandon Royval at LFA 39. Rivera had Tommy John surgery in May 2018 and returned just nine months later for what was then his ninth professional fight. During this time, he would dig wells with one arm a couple weeks after elbow surgery, desperate for any job to make sure he was providing for the arrival of Emilia, who was two years old.

In his first bout after the injury, Rivera faced Gene Perez at Jackson’s MMA Series 27 and won the bout in the  first round via armbar. Making his return to Legacy Fighting Alliance, he took on Kendrick Latchman in the co-main event of LFA 80 and submitted him via triangle choke in the second round.

He was given a chance for a UFC contract on Dana White's Contender Series, fighting Luis Rodriguez at Dana White's Contender Series 27 on August 4, 2020. He won the fight via unanimous decision, but was not offered an UFC contract.

Ultimate Fighting Championship

After his win on DWCS and not being offered a contract, Rivera was offered to make his UFC debut as a replacement for Matt Schnell after he was forced to pull out of the bout against Nam the week before. Rivera made his UFC debut against Tyson Nam on September 19, 2020, at UFC Fight Night: Covington vs. Woodley in a Bantamweight bout. He lost the fight via technical knockout early into the second round.

Moving back down to Flyweight, Rivera faced Francisco Figueiredo at UFC on ESPN: Chiesa vs. Magny on January 20, 2021. He lost the bout via unanimous decision.

Rivera faced Ode' Osbourne on February 6, 2021, at UFC Fight Night: Overeem vs. Volkov in a featherweight bout, as a replacement for Denys Bondar. Rivera lost the fight via knockout out in round one.

Rivera faced Zhalgas Zhumagulov on July 10, 2021, at UFC 264 in a flyweight bout. He lost the fight via a guillotine choke in round one.

On August 21, 2021, it was announced Rivera was released by the UFC.

Mixed martial arts record

|-
|Loss
|align=center|10–6
|Zhalgas Zhumagulov
|Submission (guillotine choke)
|UFC 264
|
|align=center|1
|align=center|2:02
|Las Vegas, Nevada, United States
|
|-
|Loss
|align=center|10–5
|Ode' Osbourne
|KO (punches)
|UFC Fight Night: Overeem vs. Volkov
|
|align=center|1
|align=center|0:26
|Las Vegas, Nevada, United States
|
|-
|Loss
|align=center|10–4
|Francisco Figueiredo
|Decision (unanimous)
|UFC on ESPN: Chiesa vs. Magny
|
|align=center|3
|align=center|5:00
|Abu Dhabi, United Arab Emirates
|
|-
|Loss
|align=center|10–3
|Tyson Nam
|TKO (punches)
|UFC Fight Night: Covington vs. Woodley
|
|align=center|2
|align=center|0:34
|Las Vegas, Nevada, United States
|
|-
|Win
|align=center|10–2
|Luis Rodríguez
|Decision (unanimous)
|Dana White's Contender Series 27
|
|align=center|3
|align=center|5:00
|Las Vegas, Nevada, United States
|
|-
|Win
|align=center|9–2
|Kendrick Latchman
|Submission (triangle choke)
|LFA 80
|
|align=center|2
|align=center|4:12
|Albuquerque, New Mexico, United States
|
|-
|Win
|align=center|8–2
|Gene Perez
|Submission (armbar)
|Jackson's MMA Series 27
|
|align=center|1
|align=center|1:07
|Santa Fe, New Mexico, United States
|
|-
|Loss
|align=center| 7–2
|Brandon Royval
|TKO (arm injury)
|LFA 39
|
|align=center|1
|align=center|0:40
|Vail, Colorado, United States
|
|-
|Loss
|align=center| 7–1
|Roberto Sanchez
|Submission (armbar)
|LFA 14
|
|align=center|3
|align=center|3:41
|Houston, Texas, United States
|
|-
|Win
|align=center|7–0
|Zac Riley
|Decision (unanimous)
|LFA 10
|
|align=center|3
|align=center|5:00
|Pueblo, Colorado, United States
|
|-
|Win
|align=center|6–0
|Saul Elizondo
|Submission (rear-naked choke)
|JacksonWink Fight Night 1
|
|align=center|2
|align=center|1:13
|Albuquerque, New Mexico, United States
|
|-
|Win
|align=center|5–0
|Jesus Urbina
|Decision (unanimous)
|KOTC: Thunder
|
|align=center|3
|align=center|5:00
|Socorro, Texas, United States
|
|-
|Win
|align=center|4–0
|Alejandro Diaz
|Submission (rear-naked choke)
|KOTC: Warriors
|
|align=center|2
|align=center|1:35
|Socorro, Texas, United States
|
|-
|Win
|align=center|3–0
|Roger Reyes
|Submission (triangle choke)
|Rocks Xtreme MMA 12
|
|align=center|1
|align=center|2:14
|Harker Heights, Texas, United States
|
|-
|Win
|align=center|2–0
|Rudy Kennedy
|Submission (punches)
|Triple A MMA 11
|
|align=center|2
|align=center|2:53
|Santa Fe, New Mexico, United States
|
|-
|Win
|align=center|1–0
|Levi Lucero
|Submission (rear-naked choke)
|Triple A MMA 5
|
|align=center|1
|align=center|1:37
|Santa Fe, New Mexico, United States
|

See also 
 List of male mixed martial artists

References

External links

Living people
1995 births
American male mixed martial artists
Flyweight mixed martial artists
Bantamweight mixed martial artists
Mixed martial artists utilizing kickboxing
Mixed martial artists utilizing wrestling
Ultimate Fighting Championship male fighters
Sportspeople from Santa Fe, New Mexico
Mixed martial artists from New Mexico